Purity rings (also known as promise rings, abstinence rings, or chastity rings) are rings worn as a sign of chastity. Since the 1990s, in the United States, Christian organizations, especially Catholic and evangelical Christian groups, promoting virginity pledges and virginity before marriage, like True Love Waits and Silver Ring Thing, used the purity ring as a symbol of commitment.
Wearing a purity ring is typically accompanied by a religious vow to practice abstinence until marriage.
Chastity rings are part of the abstinence-only sex education movement and are intended to act as a physical reminder of their chastity vow.

Organizations

Silver Ring Thing
Unaltered, formerly and commonly known as Silver Ring Thing (SRT), is an American virginity pledge program founded in 1995 by Denny Pattyn. The program encourages teens and young adults to remain sexually abstinent until marriage. For a few years, it was partially funded by the U.S. federal government. Drawing on Christian theology, SRT uses rock/hip hop concert-style events in an attempt to appeal to 21st-century teenagers. During the gathering, participants commit to a vow of sexual abstinence until marriage by purchasing rings.

In 2004, SRT began expanding operations into the United Kingdom, with mixed results. While some teenagers in the UK embraced the message of abstinence, some critics rejected and ridiculed SRT, saying it was anti-sex or unrealistic, and that it seemed unlikely that abstinence programs would attract widespread support in the UK because of the UK's differing attitude toward sexuality and sex education. The group's Assistant National Director for the UK, Denise Pfeiffer, said there was a real need for such a movement in the UK to curb what she sees as the ever-increasing rates of sexually transmitted infections and teenage pregnancies, both of which she claims are the highest in Western Europe.

In 2005, the ACLU of Massachusetts sued the U.S. Department of Health and Human Services because it believed SRT used tax dollars to promote Christianity. SRT presented a two-part programme: the first part about abstinence, the second about Christianity's role in abstinence. The ACLU claimed federal funding given to this program violated the separation of church and state. On August 22, 2005, the Department suspended SRT's US$75,000 federal grant until it submitted a "corrective action plan". In 2006, a corrective action plan was accepted by the department. The lawsuit was dismissed, and SRT received federal funding.

In the 2007 case R (Playfoot) v Millais School Governing Body, 16-year-old Lydia Playfoot from the United Kingdom alleged that her school had violated her rights by forbidding her from wearing a purity ring. The case was funded by the group Christian Concern. On July 16, 2007, the High Court ruled that Playfoot's human rights were not violated. Her father, Phil Playfoot, was the British pastor for Silver Ring Thing at the time, and was ordered to pay £12,000 towards the school's costs.

In 2019, Silver Ring Thing changed its name to Unaltered.

True Love Waits
True Love Waits (TLW) is an international Christian group that promotes sexual abstinence outside of marriage for teenagers and college students. TLW was created in April, 1993 by the Southern Baptists, and is sponsored by LifeWay Christian Resources. It is based on conservative Christian views of human sexuality.

Pledge 
The True Love Waits pledge states:  "Believing that true love waits, I make a commitment to God, myself, my family, my friends, my future mate and my future children to be sexually abstinent from this day until the day I enter a biblical marriage relationship."  In addition, they promote sexual purity, which encompasses not only abstaining from intercourse before marriage, but also abstaining from "sexual thoughts, sexual touching, pornography, and actions that are known to lead to sexual arousal."

By the late 1990s, Christian music groups were promoting the program, and events similar to youth rallies were held at Christian music concerts, providing an opportunity for adolescents to sign pledge cards.

Effect
In the first year of the campaign, over 102,000 young people signed the pledge, which was also taken up by other church groups including the Roman Catholic Church and Assemblies of God.  The campaign spread across the US, making the use of occasions such as Valentine's Day to gain attention.

By 2004, groups supporting abstinence numbered in the hundreds. During the preceding decade, approximately 2.5 million American youth took the pledge of abstinence.

Supporters
Various individuals advocate or have once advocated for purity rings. A dagger (†) denotes people who no longer advocate for the use of purity rings.

 BarlowGirl †
 Miley Cyrus †
 Selena Gomez †
 Group 1 Crew
 Jonas Brothers †
 Demi Lovato †
 Stacie Orrico
 Jessica Simpson
 Jordin Sparks

Criticism
Some studies of the efficacy of virginity pledges have found they may be effective in delaying vaginal intercourse but ineffective in reducing the rate of sexually transmitted infection. They also reduce the likelihood of contraceptive use.  Additionally, it has been reported that pledgers replace vaginal intercourse with other sexual activities, such as oral or anal sex. At least one study has found no difference in the sexual behavior of pledgers and non-pledgers after controlling for pre-existing differences between the groups.

David Bario of the Columbia News Service wrote:

Under the Bush administration, organizations that promote abstinence and encourage teens to sign virginity pledges or wear purity rings have received federal grants. The Silver Ring Thing, a subsidiary of a Pennsylvania evangelical church, has received more than $1 million from the government to promote abstinence and to sell its rings in the United States and abroad.

According to a study published in 2005 in the Journal of Adolescent Health, 21% of young adults who had taken the pledge had vaginal intercourse, 13% reported having practiced oral sex and 4% anal sex. In the 2011 book Making Chastity Sexy: The Rhetoric of Evangelical Abstinence Campaigns, Christine Gardner criticizes True Love Waits for "using sex to sell abstinence" by promising more satisfying sexual activity within marriage for those who abstain from premarital sex; she argues that this rhetoric reinforces selfish desires for gratification, sets people up for divorce and dissatisfaction with marriage, and simply adapts "secular forms for religious ends". In 2014, Jimmy Hester, one of the main founders of the program, said that although some studies have shown that many young Christians have broken their commitments, it has served as a benchmark for some who have returned to the faith.

The Jonas Brothers made an abstinence pledge through True Love Waits as teens. The band and pledge are satirized in the 2009 South Park episode "The Ring". In 2013, Morgan Lee, a journalist of The Christian Post, conducted an interview with Joe Jonas and wrote:

In 2019, the Lutheran minister Nadia Bolz-Weber called for people to send her their unwanted purity rings so that she could cast them into a sculpture of female anatomy. Apologetic minister Alisa Childers criticized Bolz-Weber for her project, but acknowledged that purity ring campaigns need to improve.

See also

 Celibacy
 CTR ring
 Fornication
 Purity ball
 Virginity pledge

Further reading
 Virgin Nation: Sexual Purity and American Adolescence by Sara Moslener, Oxford University Press, 2015.

References

Further reading
 Virgin Nation: Sexual Purity and American Adolescence by Sara Moslener, Oxford University Press, 2015.

External links
Unaltered official website
"Chastity Ring Ban", "Edward Baker". Archived by WebCite at webcitation.org/5aLToXu2m.

Official Website
ArticleWorld's page on True Love Waits and Yale/Columbia study

1990s introductions
Christianity in the United States
Evangelicalism in the United States
Modesty in Christianity
Rings (jewellery)
Sexual abstinence and religion